Tiruchirappalli International Airport (IATA: TRZ, ICAO: VOTR) is an international airport serving Tiruchirappalli in the Indian state of Tamil Nadu. As of 2022, it is 31st busiest airport in India for passengers handled and 11th busiest for total international aircraft movement. It is the third busiest airport within Tamil Nadu in terms of total passenger traffic, after Chennai and Coimbatore.

The airport handled by Airports Authority of India is served by two Indian and four foreign carriers providing direct connectivity to five domestic and nine international destinations. The airport is ISO 9001:2008 quality certified and was declared as an international airport in October 2012.

History

Pre World War II
The first known history of commercial flight landing at the airport dates back to 23 December 1936 when TATA Sons, Ltd. operated an Indo-Cylone special airmail service between Madras and Colombo via Trichinopoly carrying Christmas mails connecting their regular airmail service between Karachi and Madras via Bhuj, Ahmedabad, Bombay, Hyderabad. The Special "Goodwill Flight" was operated by Miles M4A Merlin aircraft registered as VT-AHC and piloted by H. D. Barucha, the return flight to Madras via Trichinopoly occurred the next day. This flight was a precursor for the extension of their regular Karachi-Madras Airmail service until Colombo via Trichinopoly, which began operations on 28 February 1938. There are evidences of Weekly Air Mail service in operation on the Bombay-Goa-Cannore-Trivandrum-Tirchinopoly route during early 1937 which later made connection to the Karachi-Colombo Air Mail service at Trichinopoly.

World War II
During World War II, RAF Station Kajamalai was established at the airfield and used by the British Royal Air Force. The base started operating during May 1942 and until the beginning of 1944 the base was primarily used for repair and maintenance of warplanes which on landing were taken to a workshop at Ponmalai 2 km away.  The airfield gained prominence during 1944 when planes were brought for calibration and other training activities also ferry flights started using the airfield. During second half of 1944, three squadrons were operating out of the airfield. At the end of war the airfield served as Staging Post and Personnel Transit Centre due to its prominent location.

Various units also located at the airfield during and after the war
 Nos 121, 101, and 138 Repair & Salvage Units (1942-1945)
 Air Stores/Equipment Park (1942-1945)
 No. 2 Civil Maintenance Unit (1943-1946)
 Headquarters for No. 173 Wing RAF (25 Nov 1942 - 19 October 1943) and No. 171 Wing RAF (1 August-8 November 1943)
 No. 1580 Calibration Flight (February 1944 - October 1945); No. 1583 Calibration Flight (to 15 November 1945)
 Ferry flights (April 1944 - February 1946)
 No. 156 Staging Post (March 1945 - April 1946)
 No. 60 Personnel Transit Centre (September 1945 - November 1945)

Post World War II
When Ceylon government asked permission to operate flights between Colombo and Trichinopoly in 1947, Indian government improved the aerodrome for full functioning and allowed flight operations to Colombo in 1948. On 3 December 1948, Air Ceylon inaugurated a regular weekly commercial service between Colombo and Karachi, using a Dakota flight via Tiruchirappalli and Bombay. During 1950, Air Ceylon operated dedicated daily flights from Colombo to Tiruchirappalli via Jaffna. During 1952, Air India operated daily flights on Bombay-Madras-Tiruchirappalli-Colombo route, which was later transferred to Indian airlines operated on Madras-Tiruchirappalli-Colombo route.

Beginning in the late 1950s, Tiruchirappalli was connected by domestic service with Madras, Madurai, Cochin and Trivandrum by Indian Airlines at different routings during different periods of time. During the 1990s, Indian Airlines started connecting Trichy with Middle Eastern cities like Kuwait and Sharjah. During the 2000s, it also connected Trichy with Ras-Al-Khaimah and Fujairah. Indian Airlines operated up until it was merged with Air India. Starting from late 2000, Trichy was connected with South East Asian destinations like Kuala Lumpur and Singapore by foreign airlines. Air India Express also started connecting Trichy with both Middle East and South East Asian destinations.

The airport was categorised as a customs airport until 4 October 2012, when it was given international status by the Ministry of Civil Aviation.

Terminals
The airport has two adjacent terminals. The original passenger terminal has been converted into an international cargo complex housing the control tower and technical block, when a modern integrated passenger terminal was built by 2009, which is currently being used for both international and domestic air traffic.

Integrated passenger terminal
Some of the features of the current active terminal include:

12 Check-In Counters
4 Custom Counters (1 departure + 3 arrival)
16 Immigration Counters (8 departure + 8 arrival)
3 Conveyor Belts ( each)
1 Baggage Assistance Counter
1 Health Officer Counter
5 X-ray Scanners for Baggage (3 for registered baggages and 2 for hand baggages)
4 Security Check Units
210 CISF Strength
Total aircraft stands = 7
3 for code D aircraft
4 for code C aircraft
3 Aerobridges
Parking Space for 300 vehicles

The integrated terminal has two lounges, VIP lounge managed by AAI and commercial important persons (CIP) lounge also managed by AAI.

Cargo terminal

The old terminal was converted into an international cargo complex at a cost of ₹ 10 million. The  cargo complex was commissioned for operations on 21 November 2011. The Central Board of Excise and Customs had earlier approved and notified the airport as an air cargo complex. The one-time holding capacity of the cargo terminal is 250 metric tonnes The airport is the gateway for foreign export, as there is no easy way for export from the central region of Tamil Nadu.

On 12 July 2013, the Ministry of Finance has notified the airport for international courier cargo movement. But the facilities for the same are yet to be set up by AAI.

On 11 October 2013, a five-metric ton capacity cold storage facility was inaugurated at the cargo section. This facility will be helpful during flight delay, flight cancellation, advance booking and holiday bookings of cargo.

At present, the imports are very minimal as compared with the exports.

On 1 July 2017, EDI facility has been introduced at the cargo terminal. With this facility, speedy and electronic clearance of freight is assured eliminating the manual process, making the export process more simple. This is expected to pave way for additional commodities being exported from the airport.

Facilities

Runway

The airport's older runway, 15/33, was closed as part of early development, and is now used as an alternate taxiway to the apron.

Apron and Taxiway

In addition to the above apron in the active passenger terminal, a new apron with space to accommodate 11 aircraft has been created to serve the new terminal, under construction.

There are four taxiways in the airport, designated as A, B, C, and D. A parallel taxiway and a new isolation bay will become active in March 2023. Along with this, additional new taxiways, E1, E2, E3, F, H and J are being created, making it a total of 10 taxiways in operation.

Air Traffic Control

Currently, the Air Traffic Control (ATC) is handled from the old terminal building. The AAI along with the new terminal project has proposed to construct a new Technical Block cum Air Traffic Control Tower at the airport, along with a new terminal, The initial proposal was to construct a 42.5 meters tall tower, which is now under proposal to be increased to 75 meters height, and it finalised to be 46 meters tall, including the top antenna. Tenders for the construction of the new ATC tower and technical block was floated at an cost of 92 crores in July 2022, and is expected to be completed by June 2023.

Madras Flying Club
The Madras Flying Club started in 1929 in Madras Presidency during British Raj. Operated previously in Chennai Airport premises, it had to shift their operations to Tiruchirapalli due to congestion and operational difficulties. The academy began its operations at the airport on 10 January 2020, where they have placed 6 training aircraft at the hangar, which was previously been used by V.K.N. Aviation Academy. They also have created three computer-aided smart classrooms facility in the airport. The Government of Tamil Nadu has allocated  of its land adjoining to the airport for the club to setup its operational infrastructure.

Airlines and destinations

Statistics

Expansion
Tiruchirappalli Airport has been undergoing expansion since 2004.

The Government of Tamil Nadu has agreed to provide land free to AAI for the expansion.

The airport is one of the non-metro airports selected for  city side development on Public-Private Partnership (PPP) model.

New integrated passenger terminal

It will be constructed as per Green Rating for Integrated Habitat Assessment (GRIHA) Four Star standards. The terminal is being constructed on the existing airport land available on the south side, for which a new four-lane elevated access road is being created from the National Highway 336 passing beside the airport. AAI has engaged a French company, EGIS, in partnership with the English architectural firm Pascall+Watson, as the project managers has completed the design and plan for construction by March 2018. The tender for construction has been awarded to ITD Cementation India Pvt. Ltd. by August 2018, the construction works were expected to begin by November 2018 and finish by September 2021. But due to the COVID-19 pandemic, which faced delays in work, the terminal is now expected to be completed by April 2023.

The expansion project includes the following: 
Two-level integrated terminal building
Parking for 750 cars, 250 taxis, and 10 buses
New Air Traffic Control (ATC) tower and a technical block
New apron to accommodate 5 MARS Stands (5 E Code or 10 C Code aircraft)
Upgrade of the fire station to Category 10
Expansion of the cargo terminal
Airport systems
City-side development
Rehabilitation of the AAI residential colony and CISF accommodation, consisting of 118 units
The cost of the project is estimated at ₹ 951 crore (US$120 million).

Prime Minister Narendra Modi laid the foundation stone for the new integrated passenger terminal at the airport, through video conferencing from Tiruppur on 10 February 2019.

Runway extension
The current runway at the airport is one of the shortest runways among all the international airports in India. The original runway was planned to be expanded in two phases. AAI has sought land to the Government of Tamil Nadu and once land sought for the expansion is available, the extension would take place. The district administration has expressed its willingness to pay the market price for the land to be acquired. But the extension of the runway is pending for a long time due to delays in acquiring land.

To facilitate fast process on the airport expansion, a joint technical advisory committee involving the departments of agriculture, public works department and revenue had been formed during 2012, which is chaired by Member of Tiruchirapalli Parliamentary Constituency. Until 2019, P. Kumar chaired the meetings and currently its being chaired by Su. Thirunavukkarasar. The district administration has formed a special team comprising the airport director, revenue divisional officer, joint director of agriculture, officials of Public Works Department, and other agencies concerned to expedite the land acquisition process.

In the joint advisory committee meeting on 17 June 2017, it was announced that the Government of Tamil Nadu has given administrative sanction for acquisition of land required for the proposed expansion of the runway. It has been decided to form a team to work on the exercise of land acquisition and payment of compensation. During December 2017, the Deputy Director General of Defence Estates has provided in principle approval for providing  of land to the AAI, in lieu of land of “equal value” from the state government. The District Administration is also in process of acquiring residential buildings. With this, the airport expansion has gained momentum.

Apron expansion
The Ministry of Civil Aviation initiated the plan to expand the apron to provide two more aircraft bays, increasing the bay count to nine.

In addition to this, as part of the construction of the new terminal, an additional apron is being constructed of 15,580 sq.m. size for parking up to 11 code C aircraft type, along with an isolation bay and GSE area including taxi tracks, which was tendered in November 2017, and work was started in August 2018. This expansion project will be completed by June 2023.

Connectivity
Located on the Pudukottai-Trichy National Highway 336 the airport is well connected with frequent City buses to the major bus and railway terminals of the city like Central Bus Stand, Chatram Bus Stand, Srirangam and Trichy Junction. In addition to this exclusive buses were introduced to originate inside the airport premise destined to Thanjavur, Central Bus Stand and Karur.

Maintenance facilities
Air Works has line maintenance facility to conduct transit checks on Airbus A320 type aircraft, which is the First Line Maintenance facility of Air Works. It was opened on behalf of Singapore-based Scoot for its aircraft maintenance.
 The low-cost carrier, Air India Express, has an engineering stores complex for service and repairs of its aircraft. It helps quick turn around. Repair works could be carried out here. Initially, four licensed engineers and eight technicians were posted to meet the service and repair requirements of aircraft. The stores would have adequate spares and equipment.

Awards
In March 2023, the airport was awarded as the Best Airport In the Asia-Pacific Region in the category of under 2 million passengers per annum by Airports Council International.

Accidents and incidents
On 21 December 1949, Air Ceylon flight from Colombo Ratamalana to Trichinopoly via Jaffna Kankesanturai operated by Douglas DC-3 Dakota aircraft named "Sunethra Devi" and registered as VP-CAT crash landed at Trichinopoly Aerodrome. The accident was caused by engine trouble which was noticed after takeoff from Jaffna. There were no fatalities but all the three crew members along with one of the 21 passengers sustained injury. The aircraft was heavily damaged beyond any repair.
On 25 December 1965, a non-scheduled Douglas DC-3 aircraft registered as VT-DUC met with an accident while landing at the airport due to pilot error. The aircraft had substantial damage with injuries to one passenger and two crew members.
On 29 May 1980, Indian Airlines flight IC529, a Boeing 737-200 aircraft registered as VT-EGD, was operating on Chennai-Tiruchirappalli flight with 122 passengers and 6 crew members. During the landing the commander was not able to align the aircraft properly so requested and started performing go-around, during which the left wing came into contact with the runway. The flight returned to Chennai and landed safely with substantial damage to the plane which was rectified.
On 11 October 2018, Air India Express flight IX611 to Dubai operated by Boeing 737-800 registered as VT-AYD suffered a tail strike, hit the ILS system and boundary wall while taking off at 1:18 AM. The pilot's continued the flight against Boeing's tail strike checklist, reassured by normal instrumentation. When the plane was nearing the Middle East, the pilot was ordered to fly to Mumbai. It landed safely, with no one sustaining any injuries. The fuselage, engine cowling and flight control surfaces were severely damaged with debris lodged in the landing gear.

Naming the airport
In 2012, a request was made to name the airport after Sir C. V. Raman, a Nobel laureate from the city. After the death of the former President of India A. P. J. Abdul Kalam, there have been requests made to rename the airport as "Dr. A. P. J. Abdul Kalam International Airport".

References

External links

VKN Aviation Website

Airports in Tamil Nadu
Transport in Tiruchirappalli
International airports in India
Buildings and structures in Tiruchirappalli
World War II airfields in India
1936 establishments in India